South Line may refer to:

Glasgow South Western Line, Scotland
Main South Line, New Zealand
Østfold Line, Norway
PNR South Main Line, Philippines
Sounder South Line, Washington, United States
South Eastern Main Line, England
South-Link Line, Taiwan
South Line, Chennai Suburban, India
Main Southern railway line, New South Wales, Australia
South Line, a former passenger line in Sydney, Australia, now split into:
Inner West & Leppington Line
Airport & South Line
South West Main Line, England
South West Line, Chennai Suburban, India
West South Line, Chennai Suburban, India
South Line, Tasmania, Australia

See also
North-South Line (disambiguation)
South Western Line (disambiguation)